Cervical stenosis can refer to:
 Cervical spinal stenosis
 Stenosis of uterine cervix